New York State Electrician was a title given to the chief executioner of the State of New York during the use of the electric chair from 1890 to the state's last execution in 1963, although the final State Electrician, Dow Hover, remained on call for any future executions until the United States Supreme Court briefly abolished capital punishment with its 1972 decision in Furman v. Georgia.

The State Electrician was contracted by the state at an unchanged rate of $150 per execution (with $50 added for any additional executions performed on the same day) for the duration of the position's existence.  New York did not prohibit the officeholder from performing executions for other states or for the federal government, and such arrangements were common, with the New York State Electrician being retained to conduct notable executions such as that of Lindbergh baby killer Richard Hauptmann by the State of New Jersey, Sacco and Vanzetti by the Commonwealth of Massachusetts, and the Rosenbergs by the United States.

List of  New York State Electricians

References

American executioners
Capital punishment in New York (state)